Nanae Takizawa (滝沢ななえ; Takizawa Nanae, born September 22, 1987 in Mitaka, Tokyo) is a former Japanese volleyball player who played for Pioneer Red Wings.

Born in Mitaka, Tokyo, she studied at Hachioji Jissen High School(八王子実践高等学校) and was a member of the volleyball team with Marie Wada and Ayuka Hattori there. After finishing high school, she joined the volleyball team Pioneer Red Wings.

In November 2017, Takizawa came out as a lesbian when she told interviewers on a television program that she was dating a woman. She says that her friend had encouraged her, telling her that, with her fame, she could become the Ellen DeGeneres of Japan. Takizawa also felt that she should make use of her position to give more recognition to lesbians in Japan.

References

External links
 Nanae Takizawa

1987 births
Living people
Japanese women's volleyball players
People from Mitaka, Tokyo
Japanese lesbians
Lesbian sportswomen
Japanese LGBT sportspeople
LGBT volleyball players